Pavlos D. Giannakopoulos (Greek: Παύλος Δ. Γιαννακόπουλος; 20 August 1929 – 10 June 2018) was a Greek businessman, owner and president of Panathinaikos B.C. and president of Panathinaikos AC.

Vianex
Along with his brother, Thanasis Giannakopoulos, he was the owner of the major Greek pharmaceutical corporation Vianex, which was founded in 1924 by their father Dimitrios Giannakopoulos as a small local import and distribution firm. Vianex currently manufactures and markets, in Greece and elsewhere, a variety of products, in collaboration with leading international firms. The company reported net sales of €240.2 million euros in 2012. In 2006, Pavlos' personal fortune was estimated to be €450 million euros, one half of the Giannakopoulos brothers' €975 million euros business empire.

Panathinaikos Athens
From 1987 to 2012, the Giannakopoulos brothers managed Panathinaikos' basketball, volleyball, and all amateur sports teams, from athletics to water polo. Their involvement with Panathinaikos' basketball team was their greatest success, in both domestic and European competitions. Pavlos was the President of the basketball department from 1987 to 2000 and together with his brother from 2003 to 2012.

Through 2012, Panathinaikos had won 13 out of the last 15 Greek Basket League championships (excluding the 2001–02, and 2011–12 seasons), and the EuroLeague championship in 1996, 2000, 2002, 2007, 2009, and 2011. The club, during that time, featured some of the best players of Greece, along with players from abroad, such as ex-NBAers Dominique Wilkins and Byron Scott, as well as European stars such as, Dejan Bodiroga, Nikos Galis, Panagiotis Giannakis and Stojan Vranković.

The basketball section of the club alone had a reported budget of €35 million in 2009. In 2011, Pavlos and his brother Thanasis, won the EuroLeague Club Executive of the Year Award. In 2012, Pavlos' son, Dimitris Giannakopoulos, took over control of Panathinaikos B.C.

In 2015, the indoor hall of Apostolos Nikolaidis Stadium was named "Pavlos Giannakopoulos", in his honour.

Death
Giannakopoulos died at age 88 on 10 June 2018, the 47th anniversary of his first involvement with Panathinaikos and two days after his son was elected as the new president of Panathinaikos A.C.

References

External links
Vianex Website
Panathinaikos B.C. Website – Board of Directors

1929 births
2018 deaths
Greek businesspeople
Greek philanthropists
Panathinaikos A.O.
Panathinaikos B.C.
Panathinaikos B.C. presidents
Panathinaikos F.C.
Panathinaikos F.C. non-playing staff
Greek football chairmen and investors
Greek basketball chairmen and investors
Greek billionaires
People from Athens
20th-century philanthropists
Greek basketball executives and administrators